Palilula is a village in Boychinovtsi Municipality, Montana Province, north-western Bulgaria.

Honours
Palilula Glacier on Brabant Island, Antarctica, is named after the village.

References

Villages in Montana Province